Isertoq (West Greenlandic: Isortoq) is a settlement in the Sermersooq municipality, in southeastern Greenland. Its population was 64 in 2020.

Population 
The population of Isertoq has decreased by nearly half relative to the 1990 levels, and by 27 percent relative to the 2000 levels, reflecting the depopulation of the nearby Kuummiit and Tiniteqilaaq.

Transport 
During weekdays Air Greenland serves the village as part of government contract, with flights from Isortoq Heliport to Nuuk Airport and Kulusuk Airport.

Related 
An Arctic cargobike, Isortoq, is named for the truly remote character of Isertoq.

During weekdays Air Greenland serves the village as part of government contract, with flights from Isortoq Heliport to Nuuk Airport and Kulusuk Airport.

References 

Populated places in Greenland